Full Circle is an album by American country music artist Waylon Jennings, released on MCA Records in 1988. Jennings' fourth and final studio album for MCA before his move to Epic Records, it yielded four minor country hits: "Trouble Man" (#61), "Which Way Do I Go (Now That I'm Gone)" (#28), "How Much Is It Worth to Live in L.A." (#39) and "You Put the Soul in the Song" (#59). Jennings was partly responsible for writing the lyrics to six of the album's ten tracks. Full Circle was a minor success on the charts, peaking at #36.

Track listing

"Trouble Man" (Tony Joe White, Waylon Jennings) – 3:18
"Grapes on the Vine" (Steve Gillette, Charles John Quarto) – 2:59
"Which Way Do I Go (Now That I'm Gone)" (Johnny MacRae, Steve Clark) – 3:12
"Yoyos, Bozos, Bimbos and Heroes" (Roger Murrah, Jennings) – 3:09
"It Goes with the Territory" (Phil Barnhart, Ted Hewitt, Barry Walsh) – 3:47
"How Much Is It Worth to Live in L.A." (Murrah, Jennings) – 2:56
"Hey Willie" (Murrah, Jennings) – 2:02
"You Put the Soul in the Song" (Don Goodman, Tim Gaetano, John B. Detterline) – 3:35
"G.I. Joe" (Troy Seals, Jennings) – 2:58
"Woman I Hate It" (Rodney Crowell, Jennings) – 4:34

Production
Producer: Jimmy Bowen, Waylon Jennings
Art Direction: Simon Levy
Cover Photography: Wayne Williams
Design: Dennas Davis

Personnel
Waylon Jennings - vocals, electric guitar
Rick Marotta - drums
Leland Sklar, David Hungate - bass guitar
Reggie Young, Dann Huff, Billy Joe Walker Jr., Tony Joe White - electric guitar
Billy Joe Walker Jr. - acoustic guitar
John Jarvis - piano
Steve Schaffer - Synclavier
Jerry Douglas - dobro
Mark O'Connor - fiddle
Tony Joe White - harmonica
Waylon Jennings, Curtis "Mr. Harmony" Young - harmony vocals

Chart performance

References

Waylon Jennings albums
1988 albums
MCA Records albums
Albums produced by Jimmy Bowen